The Navassa curly-tailed lizard or Navassa curlytail lizard (Leiocephalus eremitus) is an extinct lizard species from the family of curly-tailed lizard (Leiocephalidae). It is known only from the holotype, a female specimen from which it was described in 1868. A possible second specimen which was collected by Rollo Beck in 1917 was instead identified as a Tiburon curly-tailed lizard (Leiocephalus melanochlorus) by herpetologist Richard Thomas in 1966.

Geographic range
Leiocephalus eremitus was endemic to Navassa Island.

Description
The size of the holotype is given as  snout–vent length (SVL). The head and ventral scales are smooth. The dorsal scales are larger than the scales on the flanks and the ventral scales. The dorsum is dark gray with nine dark transverse bars. The tail is pale with transverse bars on the basal half and uniformly dark gray to black on the posterior half. Throat, breast, belly and the extremities are brown with pale-tipped scales.

Behavior and habitat
Navassa has xeric forest vegetation, but nothing specific is known about biology of this species. The reason for its extinction is also unknown, but predation by cats is a possible reason.

References

Schwartz, A., and R.W. Henderson. 1991.  Amphibians and Reptiles of the West Indies: Descriptions, Distributions, and Natural History. Gainesville, Florida: University Press of Florida. .
Powell, R. 1999. Herpetology of Navassa Island, West Indies. Caribbean J. Sci. 35 (1-2): 1-13. PDF fulltext

Further reading
Boulenger, G.A. 1885. Catalogue of the Lizards in the British Museum (Natural History). Second Edition. Volume II. Iguanidæ... London: Trustees of the British Museum (Natural HIstory). (Taylor and Francis, printers.) xiii + 497 pp. + Plates I.- XXIV. (Liocephalus [sic] eremitus, p. 165.)
Cope, E.D. 1868. An Examination of the REPTILIA and BATRACHIA obtained by the Orton Expedition to Equador [sic] and the Upper Amazon, with notes on other Species. Proc. Acad. Nat. Sci. Philadelphia 20: 96-140. (Liocephalus [sic] eremitus, sp.nov., p. 122.)
Schwartz, A., and R. Thomas. 1975. A Check-list of West Indian Amphibians and Reptiles. Carnegie Museum of Natural History Special Publication No. 1. Pittsburgh, Pennsylvania: Carnegie Museum of Natural History. 216 pp. (Leiocephalus eremitus, p. 129.)
Thomas, R. 1966. A reassessment of the herpetofauna of Navassa Island. J. Ohio Herpetol. Soc. 5: 73-89. (Leiocephalus eremitus, p. 80.)

External links
Photograph of the holotype

Leiocephalus
Reptile extinctions since 1500
Extinct reptiles
Endemic fauna of Navassa Island
Species known from a single specimen
Extinct animals of Haiti
Extinct animals of the United States
Reptiles described in 1868
Taxa named by Edward Drinker Cope
Taxonomy articles created by Polbot